Emily Suzanne Janss (born July 1, 1978) is an American soccer defender who last played for Washington Freedom of Women's Professional Soccer. She is currently an assistant coach at Loyola University Maryland.

References

External links
 Maryland player profile
 Maryland coaching profile
 Loyola coaching profile

Living people
1978 births
Loyola Greyhounds women's soccer coaches
Maryland Terrapins women's soccer players
American women's soccer players
New York Power players
Parade High School All-Americans (girls' soccer)
Washington Freedom players
Expatriate men's footballers in Denmark
Fortuna Hjørring players
Women's association football defenders
American soccer coaches
Women's Professional Soccer players
Chicago Cobras players
USL W-League (1995–2015) players
Women's United Soccer Association players